Shahanshahvand was the name of a royal Gilite clan roaming in Dakhel, Iran. A member of the clan, Lili ibn al-Nu'man, ruled as the King of the Gilites in the early 10th-century until he was killed in 921 in a battle with the Samanids.

History 

The Shahanshahvand clan is first mentioned during Tirdadh's rule as king of the Gilites in the early 10th-century.

Sources 
 
 

History of Gilan
Clans
Gilaks
Iranian families